Denmark  has been participating at the  Deaflympics since 1931 and  has earned a total of 139 medals.

Denmark has never competed at the Winter Deaflympics.

Medal tallies

Summer Deaflympics

See also
Denmark at the Paralympics
Denmark at the Olympics

References

External links 
Deaflympics official website
2017 Deaflympics

Nations at the Deaflympics
Parasports in Denmark
Deaf culture in Denmark
Denmark at multi-sport events